Paganini is a 1923 German silent historical film directed by Heinz Goldberg and starring Conrad Veidt, Eva May and Greta Schröder.

The film's sets were designed by the art director Robert Neppach.

This is considered a lost film.

Cast
 Conrad Veidt as Niccolò Paganini
 Eva May as Giulietta  
 Greta Schröder as Antonia Paganini 
 Harry Hardt as The Duke  
 Hermine Sterler as The Duchess  
 Jean Nadolovitch as Hector Berlioz
 Gustav Fröhlich as Franz Liszt
 Alexander Granach as Ferucchio  
 Martin Herzberg as Achille, Son of Paganini

References

Bibliography
 Charles P. Mitchell. The Great Composers Portrayed on Film, 1913 through 2002. McFarland, 2004.

External links

1923 films
1920s historical films
German biographical films
German historical films
Films of the Weimar Republic
German silent feature films
Films about classical music and musicians
Films set in the 19th century
Biographical films about musicians
Films about violins and violinists
Cultural depictions of Niccolò Paganini
Cultural depictions of Franz Liszt
German black-and-white films
Films about composers
1920s German films